The West Indies women's cricket team toured South Africa in 2004–05, playing three women's One Day Internationals after both teams were eliminated from the 2005 Women's Cricket World Cup.

One Day International series

1st ODI

2nd ODI

3rd ODI

References

Women's international cricket tours of South Africa
2005 in South African women's sport
Women 2004-05
International cricket competitions in 2004–05
April 2005 sports events in Africa
2005 in women's cricket